Nathanael Chalmers (22 August 1830 – 2 December 1910) was a New Zealand pastoralist, explorer, politician, planter, sugar miller and magistrate. He was born in Rothesay, on the island of Bute, Scotland on 22 August 1830. He was a member of the Legislative Council of Fiji from 1879 to 1883.

Chalmers was the first European to see the South Island of New Zealand inland lakes of Wakatipu, Wānaka and Hāwea as well as the valleys of the Upper Clutha River.

References

1830 births
1910 deaths
19th-century New Zealand politicians
District Court of New Zealand judges
Scottish emigrants to New Zealand
New Zealand explorers
New Zealand farmers
Ethnic minority members of the Legislative Council of Fiji
Scottish emigrants to Fiji